For Better, or Worse is the seventeenth studio album by John Prine. It consists of tracks in which Prine teams with an all-star array of female singers to tackle carefully chosen vintage country tunes in duets. The album was also released in vinyl format that also included a MP3 download pass for the album. It is his first studio album release in 9 years since 2007's Standard Songs for Average People.

Background
The album is the second compilation album featuring duets with Prine. The first Prine's compilation of duets was in 1999 when he recorded the similarly styled In Spite of Ourselves.

The 15 tracks contain 14 duets with 11 female artists (with Iris DeMent, Lee Ann Womack and Kathy Mattea recording two duets and Alison Krauss, Susan Tedeschi, Holly Williams, Morgane Stapleton, Amanda Shires, Miranda Lambert, Kacey Musgraves and Prine's wife Fiona Prine recording one duet each). The last track is a solo recording, "Just Waitin'", by Prine.

Two of the artists, Iris DeMent and Fiona Prine had been featured in the 1999 album as well.

Commercial performance
The album debuted at number 2 on the US Billboard Country Albums chart and number 30 on the Billboard 200. It also reached number 7 on the US Independent Albums chart and number 5 on the US Folk Albums chart. The album has sold 43,700 copies in the US as of March 2017.

Track listing

Personnel
 John Prine - lead vocals, acoustic guitar
 Kenneth Blevins – drums
 Shad Cobb – fiddle
 Iris DeMent – vocals on tracks 1 and 13
 Lloyd Green – pedal steel guitar 
 Mark Howard – acoustic guitar, mandolin 
 Dave Jacques – upright bass
 Kirk "Jelly Roll" Johnson – harmonica
 Alison Krauss – vocals on track 3
 Miranda Lambert – vocals on track 10
 Kathy Mattea – vocals on tracks 6 and 11
 Pat McLaughlin – mandolin
 Kacey Musgraves - vocals on track 12
 Tim O'Brien – fiddle, mandolin
 Al Perkins – pedal steel guitar, resonator guitar
 Fiona Prine – vocals on track 14
 Amanda Shires – vocals on track 8
 Morgane Stapleton – vocals on track 7
 Susan Tedeschi – electric guitar, vocals on track 4
 Pete Wasner – piano, Wurlitzer piano
 Jason Wilber – acoustic guitar, electric guitar 
 Holly Williams – vocals on track 5
 Lee Ann Womack – vocals on tracks 2 and 9

Charts

Weekly charts

Year-end charts

References

2016 albums
John Prine albums
Oh Boy Records albums
Covers albums